Juwann Bushell-Beatty (born June 18, 1996) is a professional American football offensive tackle for the St. Louis BattleHawks of the XFL. He played college football at Michigan and for the Ottawa Redblacks of the Canadian Football League (CFL).

College career 
Bushell-Beatty played college football for the Michigan Wolverines football team from 2014 to 2018. During his freshman season in 2014 he did not see any action. During his sophomore season in 2015 he played in four games as a reserve offensive lineman. During his junior season in 2016 he appeared in eight games including one start at left tackle. During his senior season in 2017 he appeared in 12 games, including seven starts at right tackle. During his fifth-year senior season in 2018 he started 11 games at right tackle, and earned All-Big Ten honorable mention by both the coaches and media.

Professional career 
After going undrafted in the 2019 NFL Draft, he signed with Washington Redskins as an undrafted free agent on April 30, 2019. He was waived by the Redskins on May 28, 2019. On August 7, 2019, he was signed by the Dallas Cowboys. He was waived by the Cowboys on August 31, 2019.

Bushell-Beatty was drafted 67th overall by the St. Louis BattleHawks in the 2020 XFL Draft. On January 21, 2020, he was traded to the Houston Roughnecks, along with Charles James, in exchange for Robert Nelson. He had his contract terminated when the league suspended operations on April 10, 2020.

On May 1, 2020, he signed with the Carolina Panthers. He was waived by the Panthers on July 31, 2020.

On March 3, 2021, he signed with the Ottawa Redblacks of the Canadian Football League (CFL).

On February 22, 2022, he was drafted 58th overall by the Tampa Bay Bandits in the 2022 USFL Draft. He was transferred to the team's inactive roster on May 6, 2022, with an illness. He was moved back to the active roster on May 11.

On January 1, 2023, Bushell-Beatty was selected by the St. Louis BattleHawks in the first round of the 2023 XFL supplemental draft.

References

External links 
Ottawa Redblacks bio 

1996 births
Living people
American football offensive linemen
American players of Canadian football
Canadian football offensive linemen
Dallas Cowboys players
Houston Roughnecks players
Michigan Wolverines football players
Ottawa Redblacks players
Paramus Catholic High School alumni
People from Paramus, New Jersey
Players of American football from New Jersey
Sportspeople from Bergen County, New Jersey
St. Louis BattleHawks players
Tampa Bay Bandits (2022) players
Washington Redskins players